The Cireș is a left tributary of the river Coțatcu in Romania. It discharges into the Coțatcu in Voetin.

References

Rivers of Romania
Rivers of Buzău County
Rivers of Vrancea County